Rumford is a lunar impact crater that lies on the far side of the Moon. It is located to the northwest of the large crater Oppenheimer, and to the east-southeast of Orlov.

This crater lies across the eastern rim of the larger satellite crater Rumford T. The perimeter is somewhat rounded and polygonal in shape, with an outward protrusion along the eastern edge. The inner walls have slumped along the eastern half to produce a shelf along the sides. The interior floor has a lower albedo than the surrounding terrain, and there is a small central ridge near the midpoint.

Satellite craters
By convention these features are identified on lunar maps by placing the letter on the side of the crater midpoint that is closest to Rumford.

References

 
 
 
 
 
 
 
 
 
 
 
 

Impact craters on the Moon